HNLMS Bruinvis (S810) is a  of the Royal Netherlands Navy. Bruinvis has been deployed both for naval exercises and in combat operations around the world.  the submarine was in active service.

Ship history
Bruinvis was laid down on 14 April 1988 at the Rotterdamsche Droogdok Maatschappij ("Rotterdam Dry Dock Company") yard in Rotterdam. The christening and launching took place four years later on 25 April 1992 by the wife of the Secretary of State for Defense at the time, Mrs. J.M. baroness van Voorst tot Voorst - Bloys van Treslong. Bruinvis—like sister ship —was built in the Scheepsbouwloods, transported to the ship lift and launched via the boat lift. On 5 July 1994 the ship was transferred to the Royal Netherlands Navy and put into service.

In 2016 Bruinvis docked in Gibraltar as part of a mission, it also marked the first docking of a Dutch submarine to Gibraltar in over a decade.

Bruinvis took part in Operation Ocean Shield alongside  in 2011 and 2012.

References

Sources

External links
Met onderzeeboot Bruinvis in Schotse wateren

Walrus-class submarines
Ships built in Rotterdam
1992 ships
Submarines of the Netherlands